This article describes the qualification for the 2022 Women's U21 European Volleyball Championship.

Pools composition
The qualification round organizers were drawn and then the pools were set accordingly, following the Serpentine system according to their European Ranking for U19 national teams as of December 2020. Rankings are shown in brackets. The CEV later excluded Belarus and Russia from European competitions in March 2022. Pool C tournament will be not held, Hungary was moved to Pool B.

Qualification round

Pool A

|}

|}

Pool B

|}

|}

Pool C
Tournament cancelled due to expulsion of Belarus and Russia from European competitions.

Pool D

|}

|}

Pool E

|}

|}

Ranking of the second placed teams
Matches against the fourth placed team in each pool are not included in this ranking. Originally there would have been a fifth second-placed team until Belarus and Russia were disqualified.

|}

References

External links
Official website

Women's U21 European Volleyball Championship
Europe
Volleyball